Astronomica is the name of two different classical works from approximately the early 1st century AD:

 Astronomica by Marcus Manilius
 De astronomica by Gaius Julius Hyginus
 Astronomica (album), a 1999 album by the American progressive metal band Crimson Glory
 Astronomica: The Quest for the Edge of the Universe, a 1994 educational game by Hyper-Quest, Inc.